NWW may refer to:

Nurse with Wound, a British band
the ICAO airline code for North West Airlines (Australia), in List of airline codes (N)
the station code for North Woolwich railway station, a former railway station in England